Wilmer Calderon (born May 8, 1975) is a Puerto Rican actor of film and television. He is best known for his role as Diego in the Amazon Prime television series Borderline, Detective Daniel Arias in the police drama series Bosch and as Ricky in the FX drama series The Shield.

Early life
Although Wilmer was born in Santurce, San Juan, Puerto Rico he left his native country at just 2 years old to travel with his parents to Brandon, Florida. His parents taught him Spanish at home, while at the same time, he learned English by watching episodes of Sesame Street.

At the age of 5 he started playing on a baseball team, with which he toured Florida playing the league in his category for a year. When he reached the senior level, he set the season record on stolen bases. He continued studies at Marshall University, where he began to realize his fondness for acting.

Career
Wilmer debuted in 1995 with the crime drama film Dead Man Walking, playing the role of Angelo. He moved to television in 1996, appearing in The Mystery Files of Shelby Woo as Kevin Crossland in a two-part episode called "Hot Seats: Part 1 and Part 2".

He appeared as Ricky in the FX drama television series The Shield and he appeared in television shows such as The Bold and the Beautiful, ER, Pacific Blue and NYPD Blue.

Calderon appeared as Estrada in the 2006 drama film Annapolis, featuring James Franco and Tyrese Gibson.

For several years, he only worked on television, with the exception of the 2002 short Hold On. As early as 2005, and turning 10 years since his acting debut, he returns to the cinema with Venice Underground.

He played the role of Tash in Fast & Furious in 2009, featuring Vin Diesel and Paul Walker, and additionally, he played small roles in television series such as Castle, Grey's Anatomy and The Mentalist.

In 2017, he appeared as Boon in the episode "Resurgence" of the drama series The Night Shift.

Filmography

Film

Television

Video games

References

External links
 

1975 births
Living people
American male film actors
American male television actors
American male voice actors
American people of Puerto Rican descent
Marshall University alumni
People from Santurce, Puerto Rico
Puerto Rican male film actors
Puerto Rican male television actors
20th-century American male actors
21st-century American male actors